Lasioglossum albipenne, the white-winged metallic-sweat bee, is a species of sweat bee in the family Halictidae.

References

Further reading

 

albipenne
Articles created by Qbugbot
Insects described in 1890